This is Not the Way Home is the second studio album by Australian indie rock band The Cruel Sea. The album was released in October 1991 and peaked at number 62 on the Australian albums chart. With the release of This is Not the Way Home, The Cruel Sea embarked on a European tour supporting Nick Cave and the Bad Seeds.

At the ARIA Music Awards of 1993, the album earned the band a nomination for the ARIA Award for Best Group. Tony Cohen was nominate for Producer of the Year.

Reception
This is Not the Way Home garnered critical acclaim. The music ranged from funky Louisiana swamp blues to sweet soul, with Perkins' laconic vocals recalling the spirit of Captain Beefheart, Tony Joe White and John Lee Hooker in the process.

The Canberra Times said the album was, "like a road movie soundtrack. It has the timelessness of David Lynch's Wild At Heart. It could be the '50s or the '90s. To the shimmering guitar melodies of "This is Not the Way Home", Perkins adds a visceral element - lines about shedding blood and skin, throwing up, and grunting, groaning, his guts as well as his emotions laid bare."

Track listing

Charts

Certification

Release history

References

1991 albums
The Cruel Sea (band) albums
Albums produced by Tony Cohen